Potchefstroom Gimnasium is a public Afrikaans medium co-educational high School in Potchefstroom, North West, South Africa.

Beginnings

It was founded in 1907, by the Theological Centre of the Reformed Church of South Africa. Dutch was the language of teaching. The founders committee existed of Kamp,J., Duvenage, A.P.C, Lion Cachet,J., Postma,F. and du Toit,J.D. The school started in the Theological Centre's Library. The first Head Master was Coetsee, J.A.A. He was head master until 1938.

Head Masters

Head masters to follow: Kruger,W.deK. (1938-1965), Combrink,A.J. (1965-1974), Kruger, A.B.J. (1974-1979), Dreyer,L.A. (1979-1982), Grobler,A.N. (1982-1985), Janson,C.A. (1986-1999) and Breed,J. (2000-2008). Oosthuizen, R.A. (2009-2021). Van der Merwe, FW is the current head master since February 2022.

Changes through the years

The first hostel was built in 1907.
The school was first known as “Voorbereidende Skool”.(Translated: preparatory school) On 13 November 1914 it changed its name too Potchefstroom Gimnasium.
The school became a government school in 1915 and was not ruled by the church any more.
In 1916 it changed the language medium to Afrikaans.
From 1917 to 1920 J Chris Coetzee taught at the school. He later became rector of the Potchefstroom University for Christian Higher Education.
In May 1947 it moved to its own building.

Motto and crest

The motto is “Fac et Spera”, which is Latin for “Work and Hope”. This was taken out of the Dutch States Bible.
The crest existed out of an anchor (a symbol of hope). The other two instruments are a pick and a shovel (symbols of work)

Hostels

The school has two hostels:
Boys- Brandwag
Girls- Cachet

Alumni
Tjaart Marais (born 1961)- Rugby Fly-half for Western Transvaal and scored 703 Currie Cup points in his career.
Henriette Grové (1922-2009)– Writer
Greta Jones (1965-1992)- Singer
Theuns Eloff (born 1955)   - Ex- vice Chancellor of the Potchefstroom University for Christian Higher Education and Executive Director of the FW de Klerk Foundation.
Theo Jansen van Rensburg (born 1967)- springbok rugby player (full-back)
Jan Brand van Rooyen de Wet (born 1950) –Singer
Ockert Potgieter (1965-2021) - South African Missionary in the Ukraine. and movie director

International connection

Since 2005 the school has a long-term agreement with a Swedish school,  Växjö Fria Gimnasium. Each year, eight students are selected who together with students from the Swedish school form a working group focusing on development work in schools in South Africa's townships. They organize different fundraising projects and help in practical construction and repair of Schools.

Performances

Academic- The best school in the North West Province in 2018.
Best academic school in the country in 2017.
The school was the overall Provincial winner of athletics in 2018.
In 1967 se schools rugby team was the best in the country.

References 

High schools in South Africa
Schools in North West (South African province)